Sim Myeong-hui (born 12 October 1925) is a South Korean former sports shooter. He competed in the trap event at the 1960 Summer Olympics.

The Korean Sport & Olympic Committee initially chose Sim to represent the country in the trap event at the 1956 Summer Olympics, but in the end he did not participate. He worked for Daidong Transport, and represented the company at South Korea's Workplace Defense Shooting Championships in 1959, coming in first place in first place in the individual division. At the 1960 Summer Olympics, he did not progress to the finals. In 1965 when the Korean Shooting Association split off separate associations for rifle and trap shooting, he became a member of the board of directors of the trap shooting association.

Sim also enjoyed fishing and cooking. He was one of the founding members of the Gwangju Central Fishing Association in 1967, and became its first vice-president.

Notes

References

External links
  

1925 births
Possibly living people
South Korean male sport shooters
Olympic shooters of South Korea
Shooters at the 1960 Summer Olympics
Sport shooters from Seoul
20th-century South Korean people
21st-century South Korean people